The Broken Horseshoe was a British television series first aired by the BBC in 1952 featuring John Robinson, John Byron, Andrew Crawford and Robert Adair. A crime thriller series, the plot concerns a public-spirited doctor's involvement with a horse-doping gang after he protects a young woman who is a witness to a murder carried out by the syndicate. It was written by Francis Durbridge and aired in six half-hour parts on Saturday nights. It was the first thriller serial aired by the BBC.

Episodes
1. Mr. Constance
2. Mr. Felix Gallegos
3. Miss Jackie Leroy
4. Mr. Ernest Carrol
5. Mr. Mark Fenton
6. Operation Horseshoe

Cast
John Robinson as Mark Fenton
John Byron as Inspector George Bellamy
Andrew Crawford as Dr. Duncan Craig
Robert Adair as Felix Galegos
Elizabeth Maude as Sister Rogers
Barbara Lott as Della Freeman

Archive status
The Broken Horseshoe was broadcast live from the historic studios at Alexandra Palace and never actually recorded. As with all the 1950s Francis Durbridge-based serials, no episodes survive.

Adaptation
In 1953 a film The Broken Horseshoe was made based on the series starring Robert Beatty.

External links

References

BBC television dramas
1952 British television series endings
1952 British television series debuts
Black-and-white British television shows
Lost BBC episodes
1950s British television miniseries
1950s British drama television series
1950s British crime television series